Armagh City, Banbridge and Craigavon Borough Council is a local authority that was established on 1 April 2015. It replaced Armagh City and District Council, Banbridge District Council and Craigavon Borough Council. The first elections to the authority were on 22 May 2014 and it acted as a shadow authority, before the Armagh, Banbridge and Craigavon district was created on 1 April 2015.

Mayoralty

Lord Mayor

Deputy Lord Mayor

Councillors
For the purpose of elections the council is divided into seven district electoral areas (DEA):

Seat summary

Councillors by electoral area

† Co-opted to fill a vacancy since the election.‡ Changed party affiliation since the election.Last updated 8 November 2022.

For further details see 2019 Armagh City, Banbridge and Craigavon Borough Council election.

Population
The area covered by the council has a population of 199,693 residents according to the 2011 Northern Ireland census. This made it the second largest council, in terms of population, after Belfast City Council.

Freedom of the Borough
The following people and military units have received the Freedom of the Borough of Armagh City, Banbridge and Craigavon Borough.

Individuals
 Gloria Hunniford : 20 December 2021.

References

External links 
 

District councils of Northern Ireland
Politics of County Antrim
Politics of County Armagh
Politics of County Down